Phetchabun may refer to
the town Phetchabun
Phetchabun Province
Mueang Phetchabun district
Monthon Phetchabun, a former administrative entity
Phetchabun mountain range